Petrushi is a rural locality (a station) in Petrushinsky Selsoviet of Shimanovsky District, Amur Oblast, Russia. The population was 31 as of 2018.

Geography 
It is located 11 km north-west from Shimanovsk.

References 

Rural localities in Shimanovsky District